Matthew Nathaniel Joseph (born 30 September 1972) is a former professional footballer who played as a defender. He has been a member of the Barbados national team.

Career
Joseph was born in the Bethnal Green area of London to West Indian parents. He played as a midfielder for Arsenal in his youth career and both midfielder and defender at the senior level featured for the club Cambridge United with 159 caps. As well he subsequently left Cambridge in 1998 to join up with Leyton Orient for £10,000. The Barbadian  won the Player of the Year award three times while at Orient. Joseph in all appeared a total of 230 times both at and away from Brisbane Road.

Joseph won 16 youth caps while featuring for England. Joseph was also capped twice for Barbados, with both caps coming at home against Guatemala and the United States in 2000.

Joseph is currently a Youth Coach Developer working with that of the English Football Association.

Honours
Leyton Orient Player of the Year: 2000, 2001

References

External links

Post War English & Scottish Football League A - Z Player's Transfer Database

1972 births
Living people
Footballers from Bethnal Green
English footballers
Association football defenders
Arsenal F.C. players
Gillingham F.C. players
Cambridge United F.C. players
Leyton Orient F.C. players
Canvey Island F.C. players
Histon F.C. players
People with acquired Barbadian citizenship
Barbados international footballers
Barbadian footballers
English Football League players
English sportspeople of Barbadian descent
Black British sportsmen